Es Mercadal is a town and municipality in northern Menorca in the Spanish  Balearic Islands.

Etymology 
The name "Mercadal" derives from the Latin language mercatum, meaning "market". In 1301, King James II of Majorca decreed the establishment of a public center of commerce in Menorca,  and the bustling open-air marketplace remains a principal attraction of the island to this day.

Features 
Mercadal is dominated by Mount Toro (El Toro), the highest point on the island. In mid-July, Mercadal is the site of traditional Menorcan festivities dedicated to the Roman Catholic saint Martin (Sant Martí).

References

External links 
Mercadal's Town Hall Web page

Municipalities in Menorca
Populated places in Menorca